Cametá is a Brazilian municipality in the state of Pará. The mayor is Waldoli Valente of the Democrats.

References 

Municipalities in Pará